Raybak Melk Abdesselem (born 16 August 2001), also known as Raybak Abdesselem is a French Karate Champion. He has won 2 gold medals in the Gold European championship which was held in Aalborg Denmark in 2019 in Finland, and Gold European Championship in Tampere Finland U21 in 2021. Raybak won two silver medals in World Championship U21 Chile in Santiago in 2019, and European Championship U21 in Budapest Hungry in 2020. Raybak also won one bronze medal in European Championship Junior in Sotchi Russia in 2018. Raybak was the participant in Men's French team for the European Karate Championships in 2019 in Porec, Croatia and ranked 5th.

Achievements

References 

Living people
French male karateka
21st-century French people
2001 births